"Pyanoye solntse" ( – Drunken Sun) is a Russian-language song by Ukrainian singer Alekseev. It was released on September 13, 2015 and stayed number one on the Russian ITunes chart for 6 weeks after release, it also ranked second for radio airplay in Ukraine the week of its release. The song hit 52nd place on Shazam's Top-100 world chart, making it the first Russian-language song to place on Shazam's World Chart.

Song 
Composer Ruslan Kvint and poet Vitaly Kurovsky are behind the creation of the song. According to Ruslan himself, he had dreamt of the melody in his sleep and woke up at 5 am to record it on a dictaphone. The next day, Ruslan called his usual co-author Vitaly, who wrote the lyrics for the song in only a few hours. The single was then released on September 13, 2015.

Music Video 
At the end of October a music video for the song was released on YouTube. It was directed by Alan Badoev, who offered to make the video for free in an effort to spread Ukrainian music. It is also noteworthy that Alekseev almost died on set after having to jump into freezing water. The video has 43 million views as of December 2019.

Awards and nominations

Charts

References

2015 songs
Alekseev (singer) songs
Russian-language songs
Number-one singles in Russia